The Sukhoi Su-30MKM (NATO reporting name: Flanker-H) is a supermaneuverable fighter of the Royal Malaysian Air Force. It is a variant of the Su-30 series fighters, with many significant improvements over the original Su-30MK export version. The Su-30MKM was developed by the Sukhoi Design Bureau and is based on the Su-30MKI of the Indian Air Force. Both aircraft have common airframe, thrust vectoring engines and digital fly-by-wire system, however the MKM version differs from the MKI mainly in the composition of the onboard avionics. It can carry up to  payload over a  un-refueled combat radius.

In 2003, the Su-30MKM was selected by the Royal Malaysian Air Force (RMAF). In August 2003, during the course of President Vladimir Putin's official visit to Malaysia, the contract for the Su-30MKM aircraft was signed. Except for Russian MiG-29s, the RMAF has previously operated aircraft of Western origin. At the time of delivery the Su-30MKMs were the most advanced and heavy fighters in Southeast Asia.

Development

In August 2003, Malaysia signed a US$900 million contract with Irkut Corporation for 18 Sukhoi Su-30MKMs. Malaysia operates eight legacy F/A-18D Hornet, and was offered Boeing's F/A-18E/F Super Hornet, but the Royal Malaysian Air Force chose the Su-30MKM instead. The Su-30MKM is an advanced variant, with considerable performance related improvements over its Su-30MK/MKK counterparts. Irkut Corporation subcontracted the task of manufacturing the canards, stabilizers and fins to Hindustan Aeronautics Limited. As part of the contract agreement, Russia sent the first Malaysian cosmonaut to the International Space Station. It was a project initiated under the government-to-government offset agreement through the purchase of Su-30MKM fighter jets for the Royal Malaysian Air Force. Under this agreement the Russian Federation bore the cost of training two Malaysians for space travel and for sending one to the International Space Station (ISS) in October 2007 under the Angkasawan program.

The first two aircraft were handed over to the RMAF in May 2007 at Irkut's aircraft manufacturing facility at Irkutsk, Russia. The two aircraft were later delivered to RMAF Gong Kedak, Malaysia in June 2007 by an An-124-100 transport aircraft. By December 2007, seven months after the delivery of the first two aircraft, the RMAF had taken delivery of six Su-30MKMs. The eighteenth and last aircraft arrived at RMAF Gong Kedak in August 2009.

In 2016, Su-30MKM successfully dropped a GBU-12 Paveway laser-guided bomb in a firing exercise. An aircraft registered number M52-08 successfully dropped the bombs at Kota Belud firing range in Sabah on 27 November 2016. This makes the first Russian-made Sukhoi combat aircraft that can use the American-made weapon.

According to Malaysian defense Minister Mohamad Sabu, Malaysia has grounded 14 of 18 Su-30MKM due to engine problems and unavailability of spare parts in 2018. To overcome this problem and increase the readiness of the Su-30MKM fleets, Malaysia has approved the budget worth RM2.2 billion for the Su-30MKM to be upgrade locally by Aerospace Technology Systems Corporation. The first upgraded aircraft was received in 2019 in LIMA 2019 exhibition.

Design

The Su-30MKM was developed by the Sukhoi Design Bureau and is based on the Su-30MKI. The MKM version differs from the MKI mainly in the composition of its onboard avionics. Thales supplies the Head-up display (HUD), navigational forward-looking IR system NAVFLIR and the Damocles targeting pod. The aircraft carries missile approach warning sensor (MAWS) and laser warning sensor (LWS) manufactured by Avitronics (South Africa).  It can carry up to 8,000 kg/ 17,650 lb of weapons and payloads over 700 nmi unrefueled combat radius.

"The Su-30MKM can legitimately claim super-maneuverability via digital fly-by-wire, canards", and two Saturn AL-31FP engines with thrust vectoring "producing 27,500 lb thrust each with afterburners. This gives them an edge in close-in dogfights, allowing the pilot to rapidly point the plane at potential targets to draw them within the AA-11/R-73 Archer’s wide infrared seeker cone, then launch and quickly change energy state and direction."

The electronic warfare (EW) systems, phased array radars, and optical-location systems with laser rangefinder were all produced by leading Russian manufacturers. At that time, officers from the RMAF formed a Su-30MKM Project Team which was based in Moscow; the team actively participated in the integration of all the avionics systems. The aircraft is capable of conducting SEAD missions when equipped with two KNIRTI SAP-518 jamming pods and Kh-31P anti-radiation missiles. The KNIRTI SAP-518 covers NATO surface-to-air and air-to-air threats in the G-J bands. It is equipped with NIIP N011M phased array radar for long range aerial combat which can track up to 15 targets and engage four targets simultaneously.  It can also be equipped with a Thales Damocles Laser Designation surveillance and targeting Pod for precision ground attack. It has a rear-facing radar,  Thales HUD, and French NAVFLIR (Navigation Forward Looking Infra-red). Missile Approaches Warning System (MAWS) and laser warning sensor (LWS) are supplied by Saab Avitronics of South Africa.

Operators

 Royal Malaysian Air Force has 18 Su-30MKMs in inventory. All the aircraft are assigned to the 12th Squadron based at RMAF Gong Kedak.

Specifications (Su-30MKM)

See also

References

External links

 Sukhoi Su-30MK Su-30MKM fighter aircraft(Air recognition)

Canard aircraft
Su-30MKM
Twinjets
2000s Russian fighter aircraft
Aircraft first flown in 2007
Twin-tail aircraft